In modern Western tonal music theory, a diminished second is the interval produced by narrowing a minor second by one chromatic semitone. It is enharmonically equivalent to a perfect unison. Thus, it is the interval between notes on two adjacent staff positions, or having adjacent note letters, altered in such a way that they have no pitch difference in twelve-tone equal temperament. An example is the interval from a B to the C immediately above; another is the interval from a B to the C immediately above.

In particular, it may be regarded as the "difference" between a diatonic and chromatic semitone. For instance, the interval from B to C is a diatonic semitone, the interval from B to B is a chromatic semitone, and their difference, the interval from B to C is a diminished second.

Being diminished, it is considered a dissonant interval.

Size in different tuning systems 

In tuning systems other than twelve-tone equal temperament, the diminished second can be viewed as a comma, the minute interval between two enharmonically equivalent notes tuned in a slightly different way. This makes it a highly variable quantity between tuning systems. Hence for example C is narrower (or sometimes wider) than D by a diminished second interval, however large or small that may happen to be (see image below).

In 12-tone equal temperament, the diminished second is identical to the unison, because both semitones have the same size. In 19-tone equal temperament, on the other hand, it is identical to the chromatic semitone and is a respectable 63.16 cents wide. It shows a similar size in third-comma meantone, where it coincides with the greater diesis (62.57 cents). The most commonly used meantone temperaments fall between these extremes, giving it an intermediate size.

In Pythagorean tuning, however, the interval actually shows a descending direction, i.e. a ratio below unison, and thus a negative size (−23.46 cents), equal to the opposite of a Pythagorean comma. Such is also the case in twelfth-comma meantone, although that diminished second is only a twelfth of the Pythagorean one (−1.95 cents, the opposite of a schisma).

The table below summarizes the definitions of the diminished second in the main tuning systems. In the column labeled "Difference between semitones", m2 is the minor second (diatonic semitone), A1 is the augmented unison (chromatic semitone), and S, S, S, S are semitones as defined in five-limit tuning#Size of intervals. Notice that for 5-limit tuning, 1/6-, 1/4-, and 1/3-comma meantone, the diminished second coincides with the corresponding commas.

See also
 List of musical intervals
 List of pitch intervals
List of meantone intervals
Comma (music)

References

Diminished intervals
Seconds (music)